The Waverley Novels are a long series of novels by Sir Walter Scott (1771–1832). For nearly a century, they were among the most popular and widely read novels in Europe.

Because Scott did not publicly acknowledge authorship until 1827, the series takes its name from Waverley, the first novel of the series, released in 1814. The later books bore the words "by the author of Waverley" on their title pages.

The Tales of my Landlord sub-series was not advertised as "by the author of Waverley" and thus is not always included as part of the Waverley Novels series.

Order of publication

Chronological order, by setting
1097: Count Robert of Paris
1187–94: The Betrothed, The Talisman, Ivanhoe (3)
1307: Castle Dangerous
1396: The Fair Maid of Perth
1468–77: Quentin Durward, Anne of Geierstein (2)
1547–75: The Monastery, The Abbot, Kenilworth, The Siege of Malta (4)
1616–18: The Fortunes of Nigel
1644–89: A Legend of Montrose, Woodstock, Peveril of the Peak, The Tale of Old Mortality, The Pirate (5)
1700–99: The Black Dwarf, The Bride of Lammermoor, Rob Roy, Heart of Midlothian, Waverley, Guy Mannering, Redgauntlet, The Antiquary (8)
19th century: St. Ronan's Well

Editions

The novels were all originally printed by James Ballantyne on the Canongate in Edinburgh. James Ballantyne was the brother of one of Scott's close friends, John Ballantyne ("Printed by James Ballantyne and Co. for Archibald Constable and Co., Edinburgh").

There are two definitive editions. One is the "Magnum Opus", a 48-volume set published between 1829 and 1833 by Robert Cadell, based on previous editions, with new introductions and notes by Scott. This was the basis of almost all subsequent editions until the appearance of the standard modern edition, the Edinburgh Edition of the Waverley Novels, a 30-volume set, based on early-edition texts emended mainly from the surviving manuscripts, published by Edinburgh University Press between 1993 and 2012.

Placenames

In Scotland, Waverley Station and Waverley Bridge in Edinburgh were named after these novels.

In North America, the towns of Waverly, Colorado; Waverly, Nebraska; Waverly, Illinois; Waverly, South Dakota; Waverly, New York; Waverley, Nova Scotia; Waverly, Ohio; Waverly Hall, Georgia; Waverly, Tennessee, and Waverly, Iowa, take their names from these novels, as does Waverley School in Louisville, Kentucky, which later became the Waverly Hills Sanatorium.

The unincorporated community of Ellerslie, Georgia is believed to be named for a character in the novels, Captain Ellerslie.

In Australia, the Melbourne suburbs of Glen Waverley and Mount Waverley and also Ivanhoe, were named after the novels as well. The Sydney suburb of Waverley is also named after the novel.

In New Zealand there is a suburb in Dunedin and a North Island town in the province of Taranaki called Waverley.

See also
 Tales of my Landlord
 Tales of the Crusaders
 Chronicles of the Canongate

References

External links
 A typically enthusiastic essay on the Waverley Novels, published in 1912

 
Book series introduced in 1814
Walter Scott novel series